Major-General Sir John Frederick Maurice  (24 May 1841 – 12 January 1912) was a senior British Army officer, chiefly remembered for his military writings.

Family and early life
Maurice was born in Southwark, London in 1841, the eldest son of Rev. Frederick Denison Maurice, an Anglican priest, theologian and author, by his first wife, Anna Eleanor Barton, a daughter of Lieutenant-General Charles Barton. He published several volumes on his father's life in 1884.

Maurice was educated at the Royal India Military College, Addiscombe, and the Royal Military Academy, Woolwich, and was commissioned into the Royal Artillery in 1861.

Career
Maurice served as private secretary to Sir Garnet Wolseley in the Ashanti Campaign of 1873–1874; in the Zulu War in 1880; was deputy assistant adjutant general of the Egyptian expedition in 1882; and was brevetted colonel in 1885. In 1885–1892 he was professor of military history at the Staff College, Camberley, and in 1895 was promoted to major general. Later in his career he was commander of the Woolwich District until September 1902.

In 1905, Maurice was part of a team which went to Berlin to negotiate with the Germans on the problems of the Navy estimates and the escalating threat posed to the Empire.  In January 1906, news was leaked to The Times that implicated him in the leaking of war material purchases, which he had discussed. Sir Henry Campbell-Bannerman, the prime minister, complained to Sir Edward Grey, the Foreign Secretary, of "an outrageous interview with Genl. Sir F. Maurice in a French paper, describing all that wd. happen if Germany & France went to war; how we of course should join France".

Later in the same parliament British government policy evolved around Grey's adherence to the Entente Cordiale and the British willingness to defend the neutrality of the Low Countries.

Personal life
In Dublin in 1869, Maurice married Anne Frances "Annie" FitzGerald, the daughter of Richard Augustine FitzGerald. They had a large family of at least 11 children. His eldest son was Sir Frederick Maurice (1871–1951). His second daughter Annie married John Macmillan, Bishop of Guildford. Another daughter, Cosette, married the Oxford military historian, C. T. Atkinson.

Writings
Maurice's reputation depends chiefly on his military writings, which include:  
Hostilities without Declaration of War (1883)
Popular History of Ashanti Campaign (1874)
A life of his father, John Frederick Denison Maurice (1884)
The Balance of Military Power in Europe (1888)
War (1891)
National Defences (1897)
The Franco-German War, 1870–1871 (1900)
Diary of Sir John Moore (1904)
History of the War in South Africa, an official account (four volumes, 1906–1910)

Further reading

References

External links
 
 

British Army personnel of the Anglo-Zulu War
British Army personnel of the Anglo-Egyptian War
British military personnel of the Third Anglo-Ashanti War
Graduates of Addiscombe Military Seminary
Graduates of the Royal Military Academy, Woolwich
British Army major generals
Military personnel from London
Knights Commander of the Order of the Bath
British military writers
Writers from London
1841 births
1912 deaths
Royal Artillery officers
English male writers